There are currently 20 countries and 22 territories that do not have a permanent natural river flowing within them, though some of them have streams or seasonal watercourses such as wadis.

The Arabian Peninsula is the largest subregion in the world without any permanent natural river. Countries in this subregion have wadis instead.

The Chinese special administrative region of Macau has no permanent natural rivers other than a small man-made canal named Canal Dos Patos (鴨涌河). Due to environment issues, this small canal is currently being backfilled with land by the local government. Eventually, this small canal will cease to exist.

Sovereign states

Africa

 (See List of wadis of Djibouti)
 (See List of wadis of Libya)

Asia

 (See List of wadis of Kuwait)

 (See List of wadis of Oman)
 (See List of wadis of Qatar)
  (See List of wadis of Saudi Arabia)
  (See List of wadis of the United Arab Emirates)
  (See List of wadis of Yemen)

Europe
 (See List of valleys of Malta)

Oceania

Dependencies and other territories

Asia

Europe

North America

 Saint Martin

Oceania

See also 
 Lists of rivers

References

External links
 , GEOnet Names Server

Without rivers
Without rivers